Cychrus angustitarsalis is a species of ground beetle in the subfamily of Carabinae that is endemic to Sichuan province of China. It was described by Deuve in 1991.

References

angustitarsalis
Beetles described in 1991
Endemic fauna of Sichuan
Beetles of Asia